Terek may refer to:

Places

China
, a town in Xinjiang, China

Kyrgyzstan
Terek, Alay, a village in Alay District, Osh Region
Terek, Kara-Kulja, a village in Kara-Kulja District, Osh Region
Terek Pass, a mountain pass in the Altay Mountains, Kyrgyzstan

Russia
Terek Oblast (1860–1920), a former division in the Russian Empire and early Russian SFSR
Terek Soviet Republic (1918–1919), a former division of the Russian SFSR
Terek, Russia, several inhabited localities
Terek, Kabardino-Balkarian Republic, a town and the administrative center of Tersky District, Kabardino-Balkar Republic

Other
Terek (river), a river in Georgia and Russia
FC Terek Grozny, a soccer club in Grozny, Chechen Republic, Russia
, a ship which later served as the Imperial Russian Navy auxiliary cruiser Terek during the Russo-Japanese War

See also
Terek Cossacks, a Cossack host on the Terek River
Terek–Kuma Lowland, in the southwestern part of the Caspian Depression
Terek sandpiper, a small wading bird